The 1938 Loyola Wolf Pack football team was an American football team that represented Loyola College of New Orleans (now known as Loyola University New Orleans) as a member of the Dixie Conference during the 1938 college football season. In their second season under head coach Larry Mullins, the team compiled a 4–5 record.

Schedule

References

Loyola
Loyola Wolf Pack football seasons
Loyola Wolf Pack football